Pedro Antonio Esteso Herrera (born 13 October 1976, in Minaya) is a Spanish athlete specialising in the middle-distance events. He won two medals at Summer Universiades, in 2001 and 2003.

As of 2013 he was still active in masters athletics.

Competition record

Personal bests
Outdoor
 800 metres – 1:47.30 (Madrid 2002)
 1000 metres – 2:18.90 (Andújar 2006)
 1500 metres – 3:36.71 (Zagreb 2002)
Indoor
 800 metres – 1:49.63 (Valencia 1998)
 1500 metres – 3:41.80 (Espinho 2000)

References

1976 births
Living people
Sportspeople from the Province of Albacete
Spanish male middle-distance runners
Universiade medalists in athletics (track and field)
Universiade gold medalists for Spain
Universiade silver medalists for Spain
Medalists at the 2001 Summer Universiade
Medalists at the 2003 Summer Universiade
Athletes (track and field) at the 1997 Mediterranean Games
Athletes (track and field) at the 2001 Mediterranean Games
Mediterranean Games competitors for Spain